As Pontes de García Rodríguez  is a municipality in the Comarca of Eume in northwestern Spain in the province of A Coruña in the autonomous community of Galicia. It is situated in the northwest of the province. It is the largest council in the province. It has a population of 11,139 inhabitants (INE, 2011). The most famous person proceeding from As Pontes is Sabela Ramil, who rose to fame after taking part in the Spanish talent show Operación Triunfo.

Economy 

The town's economy depends primarily on industry.

The town's main employer is the natural gas power plant run by Endesa. This plant is the largest in Spain and its chimney is the highest structure in the country at 365 meters and the second tallest tower in Europe. The municipality has numerous wind farms and the town itself has three industrial parks.

Nature and tourism 
The "Fragas" of the River Eume Natural Park is home to a  typical Atlantic Forest landscape. It was declared a Natural park in 1997.

Gallery

Twin towns 
 Arroyo Naranjo, Cuba
 Lesneven, France
 Carmarthen, Wales

See also
 :Category:People from As Pontes de García Rodríguez

References

External links 
 

Municipalities in the Province of A Coruña